Vasilyevskaya is a rural locality (a village) and the administrative center of Vasilyevskoye Rural Settlement, Vashkinsky District, Vologda Oblast, Russia. The population was 109 as of 2002. There are 8 streets.

Geography 
Vasilyevskaya is located 3 km northeast of Lipin Bor (the district's administrative centre) by road. Lukyanovo is the nearest rural locality.

References 

Rural localities in Vashkinsky District